Heathcote Junction is a town in Victoria, Australia.

The town was affected by the Black Saturday bushfires, including one fatality.

References

See also
 Heathcote Junction railway station

Towns in Victoria (Australia)
Shire of Mitchell